Ripple Creek is a stream in the U.S. state of Wisconsin.

It is uncertain why the name "Ripple Creek" was applied to this stream; the name may be descriptive.

References

Rivers of Wood County, Wisconsin
Rivers of Wisconsin